Usk Castle is a castle site in the town of Usk in central Monmouthshire, south east Wales, United Kingdom. It was listed Grade I on 16 February 1953. Within the castle, and incorporating parts of its gatehouse, stands Castle House, a Grade I listed building in its own right.

Location 
Usk Castle is located immediately to the north of the present day town on a hill overlooking the streets and main Twyn square.

History

Early Norman castle 

Usk castle and town was probably laid out and established in 1120, after some of the other Norman settlements and castles of the region, such as Monmouth Castle and Abergavenny Castle. However, the site had a history of previous military, strategic, and local significance, for it was here that the Romans had established their early Legionary fortress before relocating it south to Caerleon.

Usk is first mentioned in 1138 in the context of it being captured by the Welsh. It passed back into Norman hands, only to be captured by the Welsh again in 1174, as was Abergavenny, when turmoil again developed into open conflict in this area of the Welsh Marches.

Marcher lords 
The Normans had to control and subjugate the region, and brought in Marcher Lord Richard Fitz Gilbert de Clare who sought to strengthen the castle's defences against Welsh attack, but he was ambushed and killed north of Abergavenny in 1136. The Welsh duly captured Usk castle again in 1184.

William Marshal was the next Marcher Lord to strengthen Usk castle. However, his conflict with King Henry III of England brought the Normans new headaches.

Gilbert de Clare, 7th Earl of Hertford, another holder of Usk castle, was killed at the Battle of Bannockburn when the English crown's focus was on defeating the Scots, and the castle was untroubled until the early 15th century. It was here, against this background, in 1352, that Adam of Usk was born.

Duchy of Lancaster 
After the rebellion of Owain Glyndŵr (1400–1405), the castle passed to the Duchy of Lancaster and, with stability restored, no further redevelopment or refortification was undertaken and the castle was allowed gradually to decay. It survived  the English Civil War with only some slighting, and was eventually redeveloped when the gatehouse was adapted  to a house in the 1680s.

Today 
 
Today, the remains are quite substantial and include some interesting elements  such as the dovecote tower.  Although  a private residence of the Humphreys family, events are held throughout the summer months.

The Early Medieval re-enactment group Regia Anglorum has borrowed the Castle for its Autumn training for the last 6 years.

Notes

External links 

Castle Wales info on Usk plus photos
Usk castle official website
Bibliography of sources related to Usk Castle

Grade I listed castles in Monmouthshire
Scheduled monuments in Monmouthshire
Castle ruins in Wales
Usk